DATAllegro was a company that specialized in data warehousing appliances. It was founded by Stuart Frost in 2003 inspired by and as a competitor to Data warehouse appliance pioneer Netezza. In contrast to rival Netezza - which used "commodity" PowerPC chips - the DATAllegro architecture was implemented on commodity hardware from OEMs such as Dell Computer Corp., Cisco Systems Inc., and EMC Corp. DATAllegro - like Netezza - used open source software stack (Ingres DBMS running on Linux). Microsoft announced it had acquired DATAllegro as of September 2008. SQL Server Parallel Data Warehouse (PDW) is the successor product to DATAllegro on Windows Server using a version of the SQL Server database engine.

See also
Data warehouse appliance

References

External links
 Official Website
 

Business intelligence companies
Data warehousing products